Charnel House is a horror fiction publishing house, specializing in limited edition books noted for their craftsmanship. Examples being The Regulators (1996, by Stephen King writing under the pseudonym Richard Bachman) which featured bullets protruding from the front board and Last Call (1992, by Tim Powers) which featured endpapers made from untrimmed sheets of American dollar bills. Several of their releases are unavailable in any other format.

Works published by Charnel House

2008
 Odd Hours by Dean Koontz, 300 numbered copies and 26 lettered copies

2007
 The Darkest Evening of the Year by Dean Koontz, 350 numbered copies and 26 lettered copies
 The Good Guy by Dean Koontz, 350 numbered copies and 26 lettered copies
 You Suck by Christopher Moore, 250 numbered copies and 26 lettered copies

2006
 Forever Odd by Dean Koontz, 300 numbered copies and 26 lettered copies
 The Husband by Dean Koontz, 300 numbered copies and 26 lettered copies
 Brother Odd by Dean Koontz, 300 numbered copies and 26 lettered copies

2005
 Velocity by Dean Koontz, 300 numbered copies and 26 lettered copies
 Frankenstein by Dean Koontz, 750 numbered copies and 26 lettered copies

2004
 Life Expectancy by Dean Koontz, 300 numbered copies and 26 lettered copies
 The Taking by Dean Koontz, 300 numbered copies and 26 lettered copies

2003
 Odd Thomas by Dean Koontz, 500 numbered copies and 26 lettered copies
 The Face by Dean Koontz, 500 numbered copies and 26 lettered copies
 The Book of Counted Sorrows by Dean Koontz, 1250 numbered copies and 26 lettered copies

2001
 From the Corner of His Eye by Dean Koontz, 500 numbered copies and 26 lettered copies

2000
 My Own Choice by Keith Reid, 500 numbered copies and 26 lettered copies

1996
 The Regulators by Stephen King as Richard Bachman, 500 numbered copies and 52 lettered copies

1995
 Where They Are Hid by Tim Powers, 350 numbered copies and 26 lettered copies

1994
 Dark Rivers of the Heart by Dean Koontz, 500 numbered copies and 26 lettered copies

1992
 Beastchild by Dean Koontz, 750 numbered copies and 26 lettered copies
 Last Call by Tim Powers, 350 numbered copies and 26 lettered copies

1991
 The New Neighbor by Ray Garton, 500 numbered copies and 26 lettered copies

1989
 The Stress of Her Regard by Tim Powers, 500 numbered copies and 26 lettered copies

References

External links
 CharnelHouse.com — Official website

Small press publishing companies
Horror book publishing companies
Book publishing companies based in New York (state)
Privately held companies based in New York (state)
Publishing companies established in 1989